The Baltimore Belt Line was constructed by the Baltimore and Ohio Railroad (B&O) in the early 1890s to connect the railroad's newly constructed line to Philadelphia and New York City/Jersey City with the rest of the railroad at Baltimore, Maryland. It included the Howard Street Tunnel, the Mount Royal Station for B&O's Royal Blue Line passenger trains, and the first mainline railroad electrification in the United States. The line is currently operated by CSX Transportation as part of its Baltimore Terminal Subdivision.

Origins

The B&O's original connection to New York in Baltimore was through surface street transfers to the old Philadelphia, Wilmington and Baltimore Railroad (PW&B), with passenger / freight cars (also known then as rail carriages) pulled by horses along the east–west running East Pratt Street route, first between the B&O's old Pratt Street Depot at Pratt and South Charles Streets, then later using the new terminal and B.& O.'s general headquarters of Camden Street Station (built 1857–1865)  to the PW&B's President Street Station (built 1849–1850) at President and Fleet Streets, east of the harbor past the waterfront piers from the early 1830s to early 1870s. This transfer process was also used because of ordinances passed by the Baltimore City Council in 1831 prohibiting the use of early steam locomotives within the city limits on downtown streets in the more primitive years of early American railroading.
 In 1884, the PW&B was purchased and absorbed by the Pennsylvania Railroad (PRR), the growing dominant regional line in the Northeast states and a major rival of the B&O, and the PRR cut off the connection to the East Coast seaboard's main line. The B&O then proceeded to build its Philadelphia Branch (formally known as the Baltimore and Philadelphia Railroad) to connect to the Philadelphia and Reading Railroad, in turn connecting with the Central Railroad of New Jersey for B&O's New York service across the Hudson River to Manhattan. The combination also provided a connection to the Staten Island Railway, which served as the terminal switching company for the B&O's New York freight service across the Hudson River or Upper New York Bay to Manhattan. New B&O president Charles F. Mayer made the Belt Line a priority by the 1870s, and recruited young railroader Samuel Rea to work on it as Chief Engineer.

Construction

Connecting the new Philadelphia Branch to the rest of the B&O system was a considerable engineering challenge. A new surface line across the center of town was politically impossible and prohibitively expensive. Building around the outskirts of town would have required massive regrading and bridging, as the terrain is extremely hilly and the line would cut across every watershed flowing into the harbor. As a temporary expedient, traffic was handled through Baltimore on carfloats across the Patapsco River / Baltimore harbor and port from Canton to Locust Point, but it was clear that a direct connection would have to be built.

The route the B&O chose started from the existing end of track at Camden Street Station, at the west end of "The Basin" (modern Inner Harbor) of the Northwest Branch of the Patapsco River. A tunnel was constructed directly under Howard Street, heading north–south until just before it crossed the existing PRR line.

At the north portal of the tunnel, Mount Royal was constructed between 1891 and 1896. The track then curved around the northwest corner of the center city going east, passed through six other (much shorter) tunnels, continuing across the northern outskirts of downtown, curving around the Northeast corner of the old City, finally heading southeast to meet the already constructed line just north of the Canton neighborhood and connecting with the East Coast route. The cost of construction drove the Baltimore & Ohio Railroad into bankruptcy shortly after the line opened in 1895, 68 years after the line was founded in 1827 as America's first passenger / freight railroad.

Initially there were plans to build three new stations in Baltimore, but concern for interference with freight haulage and expense eventually reduced this to a single station at Mount Royal Avenue, just west by the Jones Falls stream, which opened on September 1, 1896. Lower-level platforms were added later at the east end of B&O's Camden Street Station in 1897.

Howard Street Tunnel
Its construction cost $7 million (equivalent to more than $200 million in 2018) and required 2,400 workers. The tunnel is brick-lined with iron-arched centerings. At the time of completion it was considered innovative for its use of electricity for illumination and powering of locomotives. Inside the tunnel, there was an underground platform for trains serving Camden Station. The Howard Street Tunnel is listed on the National Register of Historic Places.

Electrification

By this time the Pennsylvania Railroad line through Baltimore and points south had been in operation for twenty years. Due to the built-up nature of the area traversed and the hilly terrain, much of its line through town was in tunnels, which posed severe ventilation problems. Large chimneys were constructed above the Pennsylvania line, in a not entirely successful attempt to disperse the fumes from the coal-fired locomotives. However, by 1890 electric locomotion was beginning to appear possible, and in 1892 the B&O thus contracted with General Electric (GE) for electric locomotives, powerhouse equipment, and an electrical distribution system. This equipment was delivered beginning in 1895, and the first train pulled by an electric locomotive operated through the Howard Street Tunnel on June 27, 1895.

The grade on the electrified portion was downhill to Camden Station; therefore traffic heading southbound ("westbound", in B&O timetables), from Mount Royal Station, simply drifted through the tunnels. Since the engine was not working, the smoke produced was relatively light. Going upgrade northbound ("eastbound", in B&O timetables) the electric locomotives were coupled to the front of the train at Camden Station and pulled the entire train, including the steam locomotive, through the Howard Street tunnel. When northbound passenger trains stopped at Mt. Royal Station at the north end of the tunnel, the electric locomotive was uncoupled. Northbound freight trains were pulled by electric locomotives for another two miles, until reaching Huntingdon Avenue in east Baltimore. There the steam locomotive closed its cylinder cocks, took up the load, and the electric locomotive uncoupled on the fly, accelerating ahead to a pocket siding between the tracks.

General Electric installed rotary converters in  B&O's powerhouse near Mt. Royal Station, having a combined capacity of 5,000 kW to convert 13,200-volt, 3 phase, 25-cycle AC to 675 volts DC. In 1936, these rotary converters were replaced by mercury arc rectifiers.

Initially power was supplied through a unique system in which a pickup shoe rode in a channel above and to one side of the track. This proved vulnerable to contamination from coal smoke, and after a short time it was replaced by a conventional third rail system. When the Howard Street track was made into a gantlet to allow higher clearances, the pickup contacts on one side were mounted on swinging arms to accommodate the varying distance to the third rail. The electrification was finally discontinued in 1952 when dieselization made it unnecessary.

Latter day operation
Throughout much of its history until the end of passenger trains in 1958, the line had relatively low passenger traffic, averaging six daily New York–Washington trains each way. Freight traffic was also limited by the scarcity of online industry east of Baltimore and B&O's lack of a connection across the Potomac River at Washington, D. C., to the southern railroads. The massive Pennsylvania main line carried most traffic to the northeast.

By the 1970s, however, both railroads were failing financially. The PRR had been merged into Penn Central in 1968, and two years later the new company declared bankruptcy. The B&O became part of the Chessie System in 1973, which in turn was merged into CSX in 1980.

In 1976 the PRR line became part of the newly formed Amtrak system. The line was subsequently called the Northeast Corridor (NEC), and its role as a freight line became relatively minor. The 1987 accident at Chase, Maryland, involving a Conrail locomotive led to further reductions in freight traffic on the NEC. The Belt Line (now operated by CSX) is therefore a key link in what has now become the principal rail freight line from Baltimore to Philadelphia and beyond.  This segment of the CSX network is considered a chokepoint for freight train service from the Port of Baltimore to East Coast and Midwest markets. See Baltimore Terminal Subdivision.

Howard Street Tunnel fire
On July 18, 2001, a 60-car CSXT freight derailed in the Howard Street Tunnel, sparking a fire that burned for six days and blocked traffic for much longer. The Howard Street Tunnel fire called attention to the Belt Line, both as a risk to the surrounding structures and as a link in rail traffic.

Retaining wall collapse
On April 30, 2014, a block-long portion of a retaining wall in a below-grade stretch of the Belt Line in southern Charles Village collapsed after a heavy rainstorm, sending part of East 26th Street and a number of cars onto the tracks. No one was injured but the tracks were blocked by debris, shutting down railroad operations as well as the city block directly above them.
On May 2, 2014, freight trains once again began running through the tunnels along this stretch of the Baltimore Belt Line. East 26th Street was reopened to vehicular traffic a year later.

Howard Street Tunnel clearance improvements

Reconstructing the Howard Street Tunnel to accommodate double-stacked intermodal containers had been once thought to cost $1–3 billion. However, in April 2016, a $425 million plan was revealed that would create the needed  of additional clearance in the tunnel by trimming and notching its arched ceiling, lowering its floor, and using steel crossties, which have a lower profile than wood crossties. The Maryland Department of Transportation subsequently applied for a $155 million FY2016 FASTLANE grant to help fund a project based on this lower-cost plan, but the grant was not received. In December 2016, MDOT reapplied for a FASTLANE grant of the same amount in the FY2017 round of funding. In addition to the federal funds expected from the grant, the State of Maryland would contribute $145M, and CSX $125M, towards the cost of the project. In expectation of the grant funding, CSX is investing $25M in the tunnel$21M to improve its water discharge system, and $4M for engineering and design of the clearance improvements. The project, which would also increase the clearance at nine bridges north of the tunnel, would last 4–5 years (due to having to be scheduled around active rail traffic), create about 500 construction jobs, and would result in 178,000 containers per year being moved by rail from the Port of Baltimore instead of by truck. Maryland Governor Larry Hogan said that the state would explore other funding solutions if the FY2017 FASTLANE grant is not received. On July 22, 2019, U.S. Transportation Secretary Elaine Chao announced the award of $125 million in federal infrastructure funding for the project.

See also
Railroad electrification in the United States
List of tunnels documented by the Historic American Engineering Record in Maryland

References

 "The Howard Street Tunnel- Moving the Freight Through Baltimore", Smith, Jeffrey, The National Railway Bulletin, Volume 66, Number 5, 2001
 "Baltimore's Unseen Artery: A Brief History of the Baltimore Belt Railroad and Its Howard Street Tunnel", Lee, J. Lawrence, ASCE Civil Engineering Conference and Exposition 2004
B&O Power: Steam, Diesel and Electric Power of the Baltimore and Ohio Railroad 1829 – 1964, Sagle, Lawrence W., Alvin F. Staufer, 1964

External links

Baltimore and Ohio Railroad lines
CSX Transportation lines
Electric railways in Maryland
Historic American Engineering Record in Baltimore
Rail infrastructure in Maryland
Transportation in Baltimore
National Register of Historic Places in Baltimore
Railway buildings and structures on the National Register of Historic Places in Maryland
Railway tunnels on the National Register of Historic Places